Michael Kenworthy (born August 18, 1975) is an American actor who has been acting since the age of 5  He is most well known as the Commercial Kid, having done over 135 commercials and building a huge fan base in Canada as "Lefty" of the Shreddies Gang whose 19 commercials aired for  20+ years due to revival of the classic spots in the early 2000s. Equally underreported he starred in 14 pilot sitcoms that never made it to broadcast along with innumerable guest appearances on  other TV shows of the day that did air.

In addition he had a notable theatre career in independent films such as "The Giving Tree". Industry insiders remembered him for turning down two of the most successful sitcoms in TV history, the first being the Ben Seaver role in Growing Pains because his parents thought it would be too much of a commitment for him so the producers made him the next door neighbor instead. Secondly, and by far most notably, Michael Kenworthy was the first child actor and one of the only actors to turn down Aaron Spell!ng.

Michael was originally cast to play Brian Austin Green's part in Beverly Hills 90210 and had accepted the role for over 6 weeks only to change his mind at the last minute deciding that he wanted to go to college instead.  On hearing this, Aaron Spelling attacked Kenworthy and effectively ended his career.

Career
Michael is the younger brother of Michelle Kenworthy, who appeared with him on the game show I'm Telling!.

Kenworthy was offered one of the 5 male leads on the debut season of Beverly Hills, 90210 (1990). He declined because his family was urging him to attend college. Producer Aaron Spelling was uncharacteristically flustered by this; he warned Kenworthy that "You walk out now, and you'll never work in Hollywood again!" Michael took numerous theater/film-production courses at two separate universities...but even after getting his second degree, "I felt like I still didn't know anything. On the other hand, should Quentin Tarantino call me in, I'm there." His best known role is that of "Jesse," from 1988's horror-spoof Return of the Living Dead Part II; Kenworthy also appeared in a series of toy commercials for "Mad Scientist (TOO GROSS!)".

Michael cites Shawnee Smith, with whom he co-starred in the 1988 movie The Blob, as his first crush. "She and I hit it off pretty well. Whenever she went to hug me, I'd give her the hug plus a kiss. That always made her blush!"

Personal
Kenworthy graduated from:

Crespi Carmelite High School (Class of 1993);
Loyola Marymount University (Class of 1996); and
California State University, Northridge (Class of 1997).

Michael holds degrees in theater arts, telecommunications and broadcasting. Currently self-employed, he works with Wal-Mart on developing novelty items for young people including books and non-electronic gaming systems. Also, in more recent years, he has been supporting his elder sister Michelle through cancer treatments.

Filmography

External links

1975 births
American male film actors
American male child actors
Living people